Cedar County Courthouse may refer to:

Cedar County Courthouse (Nebraska), Hartington, Nebraska
Cedar County Courthouse (Iowa), Tipton, Iowa